Henry Bull (1630 – 28 January 1692) was an English lawyer and politician who sat in the House of Commons at various times between 1660 and 1692.

Bull was the eldest surviving son of William Bull, barrister of Shapwick, Somerset and his wife Jane Southworth, daughter of Henry Southworth, merchant of London and Wells. He was baptised on 8 October 1630. He was admitted at Inner Temple in 1651 and called to the bar in 1658.
In April 1660, Bull was elected Member of Parliament for Wells in the Convention Parliament. He succeeded his father in 1676 and was appointed High Sheriff of Somerset for 1683–84.

He was elected MP for Milborne Port for the Second Exclusion Parliament in 1679 and again in 1681 and 1685. In 1689 he was elected MP for Bridgwater and was re-elected for the seat in 1690.

Bull died suddenly at the age of about 61 and was buried at Shapwick.

Bull married Elizabeth Hunt, daughter of Robert Hunt of Compton Pauncefoot, Somerset on 14 April 1658 and had three sons and two daughters.

References

1630 births
1692 deaths
High Sheriffs of Somerset
English MPs 1660
English MPs 1680–1681
English MPs 1681
English MPs 1685–1687
English MPs 1689–1690
English MPs 1690–1695